is a Tenman-gū Shinto shrine located in Osaka, Osaka prefecture, Japan.

The enshrined divinities are:
 , 52nd emperor of Japan, worshipped as 
  in the Ha Shrine undershrine, Kami of food and agriculture, often identified with 
  in the Hakuryū Shrine undershrine, god of dragons and white snakes, and guardian god of houses, shrines and land.
  in the Hakyrū Shrine undershrine, Kami of Misogi, strength and guidance.



Inside of shrine perimeter 
 Kitano Inari Shrine (喜多埜稲荷神社)
 Hakuyrū Shrine (白龍社)

Outside of shrine perimeter 
 Ha Shrine (歯神社)

Gallery

See also
List of Shinto shrines in Japan

References

External links
Shinto Administration webpage for Tsunashiki Tenjin Shrine
Shrine website 

Shinto shrines in Japan

Tenjin faith